Susan Marie Guevara is an American sculptor and illustrator, who is best known for her illustrations in picture books. She was born in Walnut Creek, California and now lives in Santa Fe, New Mexico. Susan received a BFA in illustration from Academy of Art College in San Francisco.  She took time off between her first and second years and moved to Belgium where she was able to study with Remy Van Sluys and take painting and drawing classes at Royal Academy of Fine Art. She was the first recipient of the Pura Belpré Medal Award in 1996 for Gary Soto's Chat's Kitchen. She won again in 2002 for Gary Soto's Chato and the Party Animals, and was a recipient of a Pura Belpré Honor Award for Susan Elya Middleton's Little Roja Riding Hood.

Career 

Guevara has illustrated over 20 books since 1990. Of her illustrations, she has stated that she does not use a set style. She researches and immerses herself into the world of the characters and the story, and she adapts her work to the setting and the characters of the work that she is illustrating. Her first illustrated picture book was Emmett’s Snowball by Ned Miller, which was published in 1990. Her work in this book received mixed reviews. Later works have received more positive reviews that praise her depiction of Latin Culture as well as her use of color and style that fits a book's text.

Guevara's illustrations from The Chato Series have been adapted beyond the books. They were adapted into a video in 1999. Additionally, during the 2006 American Library Association Annual Conference in New Orleans, Guevara began a mural at the Children’s Resource Center Library, which had been damaged during Hurricane Katrina. This mural featured characters from the book Chato and the Party Animals and was entitled "Tambien de dolor se canta cuando llorar no se puede" or  "Sorrow also sings when it runs too deep to cry." This mural was finished in November 2011.

Awards 

 2015, Pura Belpré Honor award for Illustration for Little Roja Riding Hood
 2014, New York Public Library acknowledgment for one of the 100 Best Books of the Last 100 Years for Chato's Kitchen
 2006, June Franklin Naylor Award for the Best Book for Children on Texas History for The Lady in the Blue Cloak
 2005, New York Times Ten Best Illustrated Books of the Year for Chato Goes Cruisin'''
 2004, Sigurd Olson Children’s book award for Isabel’s House of Butterflies 2002, Pura BelPré Medal Award for Chato and the Party Animals 2001, American Library Association Notable Book for Chato and the Party Animals 1995, Book Links “A Few Good Books of the Year” 
 1995, Child Study Children’s Book Committee Book of the Year  
 1997, California Young Reader Nominee for Chato's Kitchen 1996, American Library Association Notable Book for Chato's Kitchen 1996, Pura BelPré Medal Award for Chato's Kitchen 1996, Tomás Rivera Award for Chato's Kitchen 1995, Americas Award for Children’s & Young Adult Literature Honorable Mention for Chato's Kitchen 1995, Certificate of Excellence Parenting Magazine Award  
 1995, Parents’ Choice Honor Award for Chato's Kitchen Publications 

 As Illustrator 

 1990, Emmett’s Snowball by Ned Miller
 1991, The Class with the Summer Birthdays by Dian Curtis Reagan
 1992, I Have an Aunt on Marlborough Street by Kathryn Lasky
 1993, The Boardwalk Princess by Arthur Levine
 1995, The King’s Commissioners by Aileen Friedman
 1995, Chato’s Kitchen by Gary Soto
 1996, Favorite Fairy Tales Told in Italy retold by Virginia Haviland
 2000, My Daughter, My Son, The Eagle, The Dove by Ana Castillo
 2000, Chato and the Party Animals by Gary Soto
 2000, Not One Damsel in Distress—World Folktales for Strong Girls by Jane Yolen
 2002, Tiger, Tiger by Dee Lillegard
 2003, Isabel’s House of Butterflies by Tony Johnston
 2005, Chato Goes Cruisin’ by Gary Soto
 2006, Tales Our Abuelitas Told by Alma Flor Ada and Isabel Campoy
 2006, The Lady in the Blue Cloak by Eric Kimmel
 2007, Numero Uno by Arthur and Alex Dorros
 2008, Voice From Afar by Tony Johnston
 2011, The Wild Women of the Wild West by Jonah Winter
 2014, Little Roja Riding Hood by Susan Elya Middleton
 2019, Journey Toward Hope'' by Coert Voorhees and Victor J. Hinojosa

References 

Year of birth missing (living people)
Living people
21st-century American women artists
21st-century American sculptors
American women sculptors
American children's book illustrators
American women illustrators
People from Walnut Creek, California
Sculptors from New Mexico
Sculptors from California
Artists from Santa Fe, New Mexico
20th-century American women artists
Academy of Art University alumni
20th-century American sculptors